The Musical Vampire is a 1992 Hong Kong film directed by Wilson Tong and starring Lam Ching-ying. It is a spin-off of the 1985 Hong Kong movie Mr. Vampire. Lam Ching-ying reprises his role as a Taoist priest.

Plot
A  scientist reanimates a corpse with a chemical, creating a  hopping ghost. The corpse can only be controlled by the sound of music. Taoist priest (Lam Ching-ying) and his two assistants must stop it before it destroys the countryside.

Cast
Lam Ching-ying as Uncle Master
Rachel Lee as Chu-Chu
 Dickson Lee as Ah Hoo
 Stanley Fung as Master
 Charlie Cho Cha-Lee as Captain Tsao
 Xiong Xin-Xin	as Ah Keung
 Tai Bo as Little Three
 Wong Chi-Keung as vampire 
James M. Crockett as foreign scientist
 essoR onitnelaV

References

External links

The Musical Vampire at Hong Kong Cinemagic

1992 films
Hong Kong action films
1990s monster movies
Hong Kong martial arts films
1992 action comedy films
Jiangshi films
1990s comedy horror films
Mr. Vampire
1980s Hong Kong films
1990s Hong Kong films
1992 martial arts films